Girija Lokesh is an Indian theatre and film actress and occasional film producer who works in Kannada cinema. She is wife of actor Lokesh, and is the mother of former actress Pooja Lokesh, and actor and television presenter Srujan Lokesh. In recognition of her contribution towards Kannada cinema, she was honoured with Rajyotsava Award by the Government of Karnataka in 2013.

Partial filmography

As actress 

 Abachurina Post Office (1973)
  Maadi Madidavaru  (1974)
 Kakana Kote (1977)
 Simhasana (1983)
 Nanjundi Kalyana (1989)
 Challenge Gopalakrishna (1990)
 Anukoolakkobba Ganda (1990)
 Ramachaari (1991)
 Halli Meshtru (1992)
 Mana Mecchida Sose (1992)
 Snehada Kadalalli (1992)
 Belliyappa Bangarappa (1992)
 Gadibidi Ganda (1993)
 Yarigu Helbedi (1994)
 Ulta Palta (1997)
 Ganga Yamuna (1997)
 Gattimela (2001)
 Ekadantha (2007)
 Nanda Loves Nanditha (2008)
 Aithalakkadi (2010)
 Sidlingu (2012)... Rangamma
 Manjunatha BA LLB (2012)
 Snehitaru (2012)
 Sangolli Rayanna (2012)
 Bhajarangi (2013)
 Jasmine 5 (2014)
 Gajakesari (2014)
 Preethiyinda (2015)
 Bullet Basya (2015)
 Krishna-Rukku (2016)
 Kiragoorina Gayyaligalu (2016)
 John Jani Janardhan (2016)
 Style Raja (2017)
 Bhootayyana Mommaga Ayyu (2018)
 Onti (TBA)
 Seetharama Kalyana (2019)
 Selfie Mummy Googl Daddy (2020)
 Pogaru (2021)

As producer 
 Karune Illada Kanoonu (1983)

Television appearances

References

External links 
 

Living people
Kannada actresses
Actresses from Karnataka
Kannada film producers
Actresses in Kannada cinema
Indian women film producers
Film producers from Karnataka
Indian film actresses
Indian television actresses
Actresses in Kannada television
20th-century Indian actresses
21st-century Indian actresses
Businesswomen from Karnataka
Recipients of the Rajyotsava Award 2013
1951 births